Swing is the seventeenth studio album released by The Manhattan Transfer in 1997 on the Atlantic Records label.  This album is a collection of 1930s and 1940s swing music with The Manhattan Transfer's jazz twist. The album also features a guest appearance by Stéphane Grappelli, one of his last recordings before his death.

Track listing

Guest artists
Sing Moten's Swing, A-Tisket, A-Tasket, and Java Jive were recorded with Asleep at the Wheel.
Sing a Study in Brown, Topsy, and Nuages were recorded with The Rosenberg Trio. Nuages also features Stephane Grappelli.
Ricky Skaggs is featured on Skyliner and It's Good Enough to Keep.
Mark O'Connor is featured on I Know Why, It's Good Enough to Keep, and Choo Choo Ch' Boogie.
Many of the tracks feature lyrics by Jon Hendricks. The re-mix engineer was Ed Cherney and the album was produced by Tim Hauser.

Cover Art
The cover art for Swing comes from a matchbook cover advertising "Hollywood's Jitterbug House" which was located at 875 North Vine Street in Hollywood.  This venue featured Louis Prima and his band.

Personnel 
 Adapted from AllMusic:
The Manhattan Transfer
 Cheryl Bentyne – vocals, vocal arrangements (7)
 Tim Hauser – vocals, vocal arrangements (2, 7)
 Alan Paul – vocals, vocal arrangements (5, 7, 12)
 Janis Siegel – vocals, vocal arrangements (1, 3, 4, 6–9, 13)

Additional personnel
 Yaron Gershovsky – acoustic piano (1-9, 11, 12), musical arrangements, musical director, vocal arrangements (2, 11)
 Gary Smith – acoustic piano (13)
 John Pisano – rhythm guitar (1)
 Nous'che Rosenberg – rhythm guitar (2, 9, 10)
 Stochelo Rosenberg – lead guitar (2, 9, 10)
 Ray Benson – guitar (3, 4, 7)
 Cindy Cashdollar – steel guitar (3, 4, 7)
 David Hungate – rhythm guitar (5, 6, 8, 11, 12), bass (13)
 Buddy Emmons – pedal steel guitar (5, 11)
 Ricky Skaggs – rhythm guitar (8, 11, 13), mandolin (11, 12)
 Jack Wilkins – electric guitar (11)
 Brent Rowan – electric guitar (13)
 Steve Hinson – pedal steel guitar (13)
 Tony Dumas – bass (1)
 Ray Brown – bass (2, 9, 11, 12)
 Tony Garnier – bass (3, 4, 7)
 Robert Burns – bass (5, 6, 8)
 Nonnie Rosenberg – bass (10)
 Ralph Humphrey – drums (1), washboard (1)
 Duffy Jackson – drums (2, 8-12)
 David Sanger – drums (3, 4, 7)
 Paul Leim – drums (5, 6)
 John Freeman – vibraphone (11)
 Michael Francis – alto saxophone (3, 4, 7)
 Chris Booher – fiddle (3, 4, 7)
 Jason Roberts – fiddle (3, 4, 7)
 Mark O'Connor – violin solo (5), violin (12, 13)
 Conni Ellisor – violin (5)
 Carl Gorodetzky – violin (5)
 Lee Larrison – violin (5)
 Pamela Sixfin – violin (5)
 Stéphane Grappelli – violin (10)
 Fletcher Henderson – original arrangements (1, 2, 6, 8)
 Carl Marsh – string arrangements (5)
 Kurt Elling – vocal arrangements (6)
 Gene Puerling – vocal arrangements (10)
 Jack White and His All-Stars – chorus choir (4)

Production 
 Tim Hauser – producer 
 Ray Benson – associate producer (3, 4, 7)
 Jeff Levine – tracking engineer
 Emmanuel Payet – tracking engineer
 Alan Schuman – tracking engineer 
 Larry Seyer – tracking engineer
 Michael Eric Hutchinson – vocal tracking
 Terry Becker – additional recording, mixing (13)
 Tom McCauley – additional recording
 Kent Bruce – assistant engineer 
 Paul Dicato – assistant engineer
 Steve Lowery – assistant engineer
 Tony Rambo – assistant engineer
 Brent Reilly – assistant engineer
 Ed Cherney – mixing (1-12)
 Doug Sax – mastering 
 Thomas Bricker – art direction, design 
 Michael Tighe – photography 
 Jack White –project coordinator,  management

Studios
 Tracks 1-12 recorded at Red Zone Studios (Burbank, California); Goldmine Studio (Tarzana, California); Moving Hands Studios (Los Angeles, California); Sound Emporium (Nashville, Tennessee); Bismeaux Studios (Austin, Texas); Unique Recording Studios (New York City, New York); Studio Acousti (Paris, France).
 Track 13 recorded live at The Ryman Auditorium (Nashville, Tennessee).
 Mixed at Record Plant (Los Angeles, California) and Andora Studios (Hollywood, California).
 Mastered at The Mastering Lab (Hollywood, California).

References / Sources
 The Manhattan Transfer Official Website

Specific

The Manhattan Transfer albums
1997 albums
Atlantic Records albums